Yelm School District, also known as Yelm Community Schools, is a public school district in Thurston County, Washington, United States, which serves the city of Yelm.

In 2021, Yelm School District had a student enrollment of 5,443.

Elementary schools

Secondary schools

References

External links
Yelm Community Schools

Education in Thurston County, Washington
School districts in Washington (state)